Opana may refer to:

 Opana Radar Site, a National Historic Landmark commemorating the first use of radar, located on Oahu, Hawaii
 Opana, a brand name for the opioid oxymorphone

See also